Mill Plain is an unincorporated area in the City of Danbury, Connecticut, United States. It is located in the westernmost part of the city, bordering the town of Southeast, New York.

History

Defined as a village in the western part of Danbury, Mill Plain has also historically been considered a semi-autonomous hamlet. The first home in the area was built around 1720 by Nathaniel Stevens. By 1725 Samuel Castle had built his second grist mill, located in this section of town, which gave rise to the name Mill Plain. The area belonged to the town of Ridgefield at that time.

In 1865, resident Henry M. Senior opened a general store and post office. Five years later, Senior built a hat manufacturing shop in the area, which operated until 1892. Mill Plain station, was built in 1881, and closed in 1928 after being acquired by the New York, New Haven and Hartford Railroad.
The post office was operated by the Senior family until the 1940s.

Parks and recreation
Richter Park
Farrington Woods
Lake Kenosia Park

Notable people
Marian Anderson (1897-1993)

References

External links
Towns, Villages, and Districts with No Post Office of Same Name
OpenStreetMap - Mill Plain Hamlet

Neighborhoods in Connecticut
Populated places in Fairfield County, Connecticut
Geography of Danbury, Connecticut
Villages in Fairfield County, Connecticut
Danbury, Connecticut